Augusto Álvaro da Silva (April 8, 1876 – August 14, 1968) was a Brazilian Cardinal of the Roman Catholic Church. He served as Archbishop of São Salvador da Bahia from 1924 until his death in 1968, and was elevated to the cardinalate in 1953 by Pope Pius XII.

Biography
Born in Recife, Augusto da Silva studied at the seminary in Olinda before being ordained to the priesthood on March 5, 1899. He then did pastoral work in Olinda, and also served as Master of Ceremonies to the cathedral. Silva was raised to the rank of Privy Chamberlain of His Holiness on September 30, 1908.

On May 12, 1911, Silva was appointed the first Bishop of Floresta by Pope Pius X. He received his episcopal consecration on the following October 22 from Archbishop Luís da Silva Brito, with Bishops Francisco de Paula Silva, CM, and Joaquim d'Almeida serving as co-consecrators. Silva was later named Bishop of Barra do Rio Grande on June 25, 1915, and Archbishop of São Salvador da Bahia on December 17, 1924. In virtue of his position as Archbishop of São Salvador da Bahia, he was also Primate of the Church in Brazil.

Pope Pius XII created Silva Cardinal-Priest of S. Angelo in Pescheria in the consistory of January 12, 1953. He attended the first General Conference of the Latin American Episcopal Conference in 1955, and the Second Vatican Council from 1962 to 1965. Silva was one of the cardinal electors in the 1958 papal conclave that selected Pope John XXIII, and again participated in the conclave of 1963, which resulted in the election of Pope Paul VI.

The Cardinal died in São Salvador da Bahia, at age 92. He is buried in the Cathedral-Basilica of the Transfiguration of the Lord.

Demolition of the Old Cathedral of Salvador 

As Archbishop of São Salvador da Bahia Augusto da Silva allowed the demolition of three colonial buildings in the Historic Center of Salvador. The 16th-century Old Cathedral of Salvador was demolished on August 7, 1933 to make room tram routes into the upper city and trolley storage. The lines were soon abandoned. The former Jesuit church of Salvador became the new Cathedral of Salvador in the same year.

References

External links
Cardinals of the Holy Roman Church
Catholic-Hierarchy

1876 births
1968 deaths
Cardinals created by Pope Pius XII
Brazilian cardinals
Roman Catholic archbishops of São Salvador da Bahia
20th-century Roman Catholic archbishops in Brazil
Participants in the Second Vatican Council
Roman Catholic bishops of Barra
Roman Catholic bishops of Pesqueira